Agricultural Training Institute (ATI) was established in 1922 in  Peshawar, Khyber Pakhtunkhwa, Pakistan. The ATI is working under the Khyber Pakhtunkhwa Department of Agriculture.

History
The current building of ATI was constructed in 1922 as normal training college (Vocational Training) by Education Department which was temporarily loaned to University of Peshawar.

Programs
 Agricultural Sciences (Dip-3 years)
 Veterinary Assistant (Dip-3 years)

Attack

On 1 December 2017, 3–4 gunmen of Tehreek-e-Taliban attacked  ATI as a result of which at least 13 people were killed and 35+ were injured.

See also
Khyber Pakhtunkhwa Department of Agriculture
Agricultural University Peshawar

References

External links
Agricultural Training Institute

Veterinary schools in Pakistan
Agricultural universities and colleges in Pakistan
Educational institutions established in 1922
 
1922 establishments in British India
Universities and colleges in Peshawar
Public universities and colleges in Khyber Pakhtunkhwa